Natalie Price is an American politician who currently represents Michigan's 5th House of Representatives district in the Michigan House of Representatives. She was elected in the 2022 Michigan House of Representatives election. She previously served as a member of the Berkley city council. She is a member of the Democratic Party.

Electoral history

References

External links

Living people
Democratic Party members of the Michigan House of Representatives
Women state legislators in Michigan
Women city councillors in Michigan
21st-century American politicians
21st-century American women politicians
People from Berkley, Michigan
Year of birth missing (living people)